Aakhri Goli is a 1977 Bollywood action film directed by Shibu Mitra. It stars Sunil Dutt and Leena Chandavarkar in pivotal roles. The music was composed by Kalyanji-Anandji.

Cast
Sunil Dutt as Vikram Singh / Sher Singh
Leena Chandavarkar as Suman Singh
Farida Jalal as Indu Singh
Nirupa Roy as Janki Singh
Ajit as Thakur Mahendra Pratap Singh
Amjad Khan as Sardar Veerendra Pratap Singh
Om Prakash as Major Chaudhary Keerti Singh
Urmila Bhatt as Suchitra Singh

Soundtrack

References

External links
 

1977 films
1970s Hindi-language films
1970s action films
Films scored by Kalyanji Anandji
Films directed by Shibu Mitra
Hindi-language crime films